The 1894 Rhode Island gubernatorial election was held on April 4, 1894. Incumbent Republican Daniel Russell Brown defeated Democratic nominee David S. Baker with 53.15% of the vote.

General election

Candidates
Major party candidates
Daniel Russell Brown, Republican
David S. Baker, Democratic

Other candidates
Henry B. Metcalf, Prohibition
Charles G. Baylor, Socialist Labor
Henry A. Burlingame, People's

Results

References

1894
Rhode Island
Gubernatorial